Fat City is the second studio album by American singer-songwriter Shawn Colvin. It was released on October 27, 1992, on Columbia Records.

Fat City peaked at number 142 on the Billboard 200 and at number 2 on Billboards Top Heatseekers chart. "Round of Blues" and "I Don't Know Why" charted on Billboards Modern Rock Tracks and Adult Contemporary single charts, respectively. "Tenderness on the Block" is a cover version of a song released on Warren Zevon's 1978 album Excitable Boy. Opening track "Polaroids" provided the title of her greatest hits album Polaroids: A Greatest Hits Collection, which was released in 2004.

Songwriting
In an interview with Performing Songwriter magazine, Colvin described how she co-wrote songs for Fat City:
The way that I generally co-write is that someone else writes the music or part of the music. Like on "Round of Blues" I wrote the whole song but Larry Klein said that it needed a bridge. So he wrote the bridge and I wrote the words to it. But Elly and I really shared every part of ["Set the Prairie on Fire"] equally. She wrote some of the words, I wrote some of the words, she wrote some of the music, I wrote some of the music.

Track listing

Personnel
Shawn Colvin – guitar, vocals
Bruce Hornsby – piano, background vocals
David Lindley – Hawaiian guitar, bazouki, lap steel Guitar
Joni Mitchell – percussion
The Subdudes – vocals
Richard Thompson – guitar
Chris Whitley – National Steel guitar (8)
Tommy Malone – guitar, background vocals
Valerie Carter – background vocals
Jim Keltner – drums
Alex Acuña – percussion
Steve Amedee – drums, background vocals
Robin Batteau – background vocals
Larry Campbell – fiddle, pedal steel
Mary Chapin Carpenter – background vocals
Vinnie Colaiuta – drums
Denny Fongheiser – drums
Béla Fleck – banjo
Milt Grayson – background vocals
Richie Hayward – drum brushes
Curtis King – background vocals
Larry Klein – bass, percussion, guitar, keyboards, drum programming
Greg Leisz – pedal steel
John Leventhal – guitar, bass, percussion
John Magnie – accordion, background vocals
Bill Payne – organ
Jeff Pevar – guitar
Steuart Smith – guitar
Fonzi Thornton – background vocals
Ken White – keyboards, background vocals
Vinnie Zummo – guitar
Johnny Ray Allen – bass
Booker T. Jones – Hammond organ

References

Shawn Colvin albums
Albums produced by David Kahne
Albums produced by Larry Klein
Albums produced by John Leventhal
Columbia Records albums
1992 albums